Robert Raymond Boeser (June 30, 1927 – October 29, 1995) is an American ice hockey player who competed in ice hockey at the 1948 Winter Olympics.

Boeser was a member of the American ice hockey team which played eight games, but was disqualified, at the 1948 Winter Olympics hosted by St. Moritz, Switzerland.

External links

1927 births
1995 deaths
Ice hockey people from Minneapolis
Ice hockey players at the 1948 Winter Olympics
Olympic ice hockey players of the United States
American men's ice hockey centers